Biard is a surname. Notable people with the surname include:

François-Auguste Biard (1799–1882), French painter
Henri Biard, director of the French counterintelligence and domestic intelligence service from 1972 to 1974
James R. Biard (born 1931), American engineer and inventor
Pierre Biard (1567–1622), French Jesuit missionary
Tex Biard (1912–2009), American translator (Japanese) and cryptographer